Kadambari (2015) is a Bengali film directed by Suman Ghosh and produced by Rakesh Singh. The music of the film was composed by Bickram Ghosh. This is a biopic of Kadambari Devi, the sister-in-law of Rabindranath Tagore and Konkona Sen Sharma and Parambrata Chatterjee played the lead roles.

Plot 

This is a biopic of Kadambari Devi, the sister-in-law of Rabindranath Tagore, and daughter-in-law of Debendranath Tagore. Rabindranath's elder brother Jyotirindranath Tagore married Kadambari. In 1868 when Kadambari came to Jorasanko Thakur Bari, Rabidranath was 7 years old and  Kadambari was 2 years elder than Rabindranath. Very soon Rabindranath became Kadambari's friend and playmate. She inspired young Rabindranath in composing many of his poems and songs. On 9 December 1883, Rabindranath married Mrinalini Devi. Four months after the marriage on 21 April (1884), Kadambari committed suicide. The director captured these details, and specially the relationship between Kadambari and Rabindranath in this film.

Cast 
 Konkona Sen Sharma as Kadambari Devi
 Parambrata Chatterjee as Rabindranath Tagore
 Kaushik Sen as Jyotirindranath Tagore
 Titas Bhowmik as Jnanadanandini Devi
 Sanjoy Nag as Debendranath Tagore
 Srikanto Acharya as Satyendranath Tagore
Sreelekha Mitra as Binodini Dasi

Critical reception
Upam Buzarbaruah of The Times of India reviewed "Kadambari is a film you shouldn't miss. Yes, it has its minor flaws, but when it comes to being an entertainer, it gets full marks."

Awards
 2015; Best Film Award at Washington DC South Asian Film Festival

References

External links 
 

Films about suicide
Memorials to Rabindranath Tagore
Bengali-language Indian films
2010s Bengali-language films
Films directed by Suman Ghosh